SS Clearton was a  British cargo steamship. She was launched on 29 July and completed in September 1919 by Richardson, Duck and Company, Stockton-on-Tees for the shipping firm of R. Chapman & Son, Newcastle-upon-Tyne. Her homeport was Newcastle-upon-Tyne.

Career and loss
In the Second World War she sailed in convoys, carrying food supplies to the United Kingdom. Her last convoy, SL 36, took her from Rosario, Argentina to Manchester, via Freetown, Sierra Leone, where she arrived on 15 June 1940. She was carrying a cargo of 7,320 tons of cereals, commanded by her Master, John Edward Elsdon.

At 1155 hours on 1 July 1940  torpedoed and damaged Clearton about 180 miles west of Ushant. The ship fell behind the convoy and at 1325 hours U-102 torpedoed her again, sinking her 042° 240 miles from Smalls. Eight crew members were lost out of a total complement of 34. The Admiralty-modified W-class destroyer  sank the submarine, rescued Cleartons Master, 24 crew members and one DEMS gunner, and brought the survivors to Plymouth.

Footnotes

1919 ships
Merchant ships of the United Kingdom
Maritime incidents in July 1940
Ships sunk by German submarines in World War II
Standard World War I ships
Steamships of the United Kingdom
Ships built on the River Tees
World War II merchant ships of the United Kingdom
World War II shipwrecks in the Atlantic Ocean